An Australian national cricket team captained by Ian Craig toured New Zealand in February and March 1960. None of the Australian players who had been on the recently completed Test tour of India and Pakistan took part. The Australians won one of the four non-Test matches against the New Zealand national cricket team; the other three were drawn. There were two other first-class matches.

Team 

 Ian Craig (captain)
 Brian Booth
 Barry Fisher
 Ron Gaunt
 John Lill
 Len Maddocks
 Johnny Martin
 Frank Misson
 Jack Potter
 Ian Quick
 John Shaw
 Bob Simpson
 Keith Slater
 Grahame Thomas

References

1960 in Australian cricket
1960 in New Zealand cricket
New Zealand cricket seasons from 1945–46 to 1969–70
1959-60
International cricket competitions from 1945–46 to 1960